Cosmopterix laetificoides is a moth in the family Cosmopterigidae. It was described by Sinev in 1993. It is found in Russia and Japan.

References

Natural History Museum Lepidoptera generic names catalog

Moths described in 1993
laetificoides